1960s décor refers to a distinct style of interior decoration that became prominent in the 1960s and early 1970s. Green, (such as pea green and drab), yellow, pink, and orange (such as peach and saffron) hues were popular for wallpaper, carpets, curtains, sofas, chair seats, and cushions, often with patterns or bright flowers. English decorator David Hicks was an important influence on interiors in the 1960s, inspired by bright colours associated with India. Hicks popularized use of "psychedelic patterns and acid-edged colors," peaking in the period 1967–1973, a time when there was interest in the  Hippie movement and "flower power."  In the same era, Dorothy Draper, one of Manhattan's top interior decorators of the 1960s, used 'dull' white and 'shiny' black as one of her favorite combinations.

The "Retro Modern" style is associated with the decades of the 1950s and 1960s. As a furniture material, polypropylene, which was manufactured in colors that could be matched to paint chips, came into its own.  Foam molding, mostly used as upholstery cushions, became a basic structural unit for furniture in the early 1960s.  Large areas, such as sofas, beds, carpets, drapes and wallcovers, were covered in vibrant colors and patterns. Employing "psychedelic intensity", the colors and styles were influenced by India, Spain, and the Mediterranean.

In the 1950s and 1960s, specialized patterns in wall painting were developed. Sherwin-Williams  manufactured an Applique system and similar systems were manufactured by Karl Höhn, also Reuss, in Germany.

Many hotels and restaurants retain their décor from the 1960s or specifically employ Sixties-style features to give them a more nostalgic sensibility. Pink or orange paintwork, bedspreads, and curtains, which were fashionable in the 1960s, however, were considered by some to be "hideous" or "painful" by the early 2000s. As Paul Evans put it, "For many the popular image of 1960s home design was of ephemerality and excess, of plastic or paper chairs and lurid carpets and wallpaper." By the 2020s, however, many of these previously-loathed styles and colors came back into fashion with movements such as cottagecore, spread on social media platforms such as TikTok. 

Television series from the era, such as The Avengers, Batman, The Man from U.N.C.L.E, Bewitched, The Saint, and Randall and Hopkirk (Deceased) provide fine examples of the type of décor popular during this period and are an important aspect of the look of the productions; for the latter, orange hues are included in the title design.

List of Major Contributing Designers

 Verner Panton
 Charles and Ray Eames
 Eero Saarinen
 Peter Max
 Alexander Girard
 Maija Isola 
 David Hicks
 Celia Birtwell
 Hans Krondahl
 Lily Goddard
 Andy Warhol
 Vuokko Nurmesniemi
 Lucienne Day
 Jack Lenor Larsen
 Bernat Klein
 Dorothy Liebes
 Franco Scalamandré
 Marianne Straub
 Terence Conran
 Mary White
 Bob Hieronimus
 Wes Wilson

References

Interior design
1960s fashion
Hippie movement